The Jungle Book is a 3D CGI animated television series co-produced by DQ Entertainment International, MoonScoop (Season 1–2), Ellipsanime Productions (Season 3), ZDF, ZDF Enterprises, TF1 (Season 1–2) and Les Cartooneurs Associés (Season 3). It is based on the Rudyard Kipling book of the same name.

Plot
The adventures of Mowgli, a human foundling raised by Akela's wolf pack, and his best friends, fatherly bear Baloo and playful panther Bagheera. They live in the Indian jungle where many dangers lurk, such as the mighty Bengal tiger Shere Khan. The inquisitive Mowgli often gets himself into trouble and can't resist helping animals in danger or solving other problems.

Characters

Main
 Mowgli (voiced by Emma Tate in seasons 1–2, Sarah Natochenny in season 3) – A young human raised by wolves in the jungle, as the adoptive son of Daruka and Raksha, and the brother of Lali and Bala. He keeps a tiger claw as a pendant which he took in a battle from Shere Khan. Mowgli is never depicted as naked, as in the book.
 Bagheera (voiced by Sam Gold in seasons 1–2, Abe Goldfarb in season 3) – A black panther. He is Mowgli's best friend. Unlike most other adaptations (like Disney's 1967 film), Bagheera is not as wise or strict as in the book. Most animals in the jungle never dare to step in the way of the panther. He often fights Shere Khan to save Mowgli.
 Baloo (voiced by Jimmy Hibbert in seasons 1–2, David Wills in season 3) – A hungry brown bear. In the series, he is bipedal, wears glasses and he is Mowgli's mentor. Baloo likes to tell stories of the jungle.
 Kaa (voiced by Joseph J. Terry in seasons 1–2, Billy Bob Thompson in season 3) – An Indian rock python who is sort of friends with Mowgli, Bagheera, and Baloo, yet moody and feared.

Seeonee Wolf Pack
 Akela (voiced by Joseph J. Terry in seasons 1–2) – An Indian wolf who is the most trusted leader of the Seeonee Wolf Pack and the grandfather of Phaona. He is Father of Daruka and In law of Raksha.
 Daruka (voiced by Aaron Albertus in seasons 1–2) – The adopted father of Mowgli. Although Mowgli usually lives with Baloo and Bagheera, he visits Daruka's family sometimes. 
 Raksha – The adopted mother of Mowgli. She is patient and motherly, but can be stern when necessary.
 Lali – The daughter of Daruka and Raksha. She is sweet, and caring, like her mother, but can be extremely protective and rebellious. Her grandfather is Akela.
 Bala – The son of Daruka and Raksha. He is a brave and loyal, but competitive wolf, who often gets in trouble. His grandfather is Akela.

Villains
 Shere Khan (voiced by David Holt in seasons 1–2, Marc Thompson in season 3) – A man-eating Bengal tiger who is the main antagonist of the series. He's territorial and going to kill and eat Mowgli, but often fails in his attempts. He has a scar on his left eye. Shere Khan lost one of his claws in an earlier fight with Mowgli who keeps the claw as a pendant.
 Tabaqui (voiced by Nigel Pilkington in seasons 1–2) – An Indian jackal. He is Shere Khan's sycophantic, greedy, devious sidekick where he lacks the courage to disagree with his tiger master. He is usually the one to set up traps for Mowgli so Shere Khan can eat him.
 Bandar-log – A group of langurs who like to cause trouble for Mowgli and his friends. They live in the Cold Lair temple ruins.
 Masha (voiced by Joseph J. Terry in seasons 1–2) – A langur who is the queen of the Bandar-logs.
 Jacala – A giant Mugger crocodile who would eat anyone that trespasses into his territory.
 Kala (voiced by Colin McFarlane in season 1-2) - A black panther who looks like his rival, Bagheera, with a scar. Highly territorial and hostile towards Bagheera and Mowgli. He also has a scar on his right eye.
 Phaona (voiced by Aaron Albertus in seasons 1–2) – An Indian wolf who is the grandson of Akela. He dislikes Mowgli being in the wolf pack, tries every attempt to expel the adopted human from the pack, and will stop at nothing to attempt becoming the next pack leader. Phaona's plots tend to backfire and he tends to get punished by his grandfather.
 Harjeet/Harjit – A bad-tempered and highly territorial honey badger.
 Kaloo – A Crow who works for Shere Khan, and has a rivalry with Tabaqui.

Other animals
 Darzi (voiced by Peter Michail/Teresa Gallagher in seasons 1–2) – A tiny solid-red bird without a mate or nest. Brave for her size and friendly, but poor as a messenger (as in the book) causing bird-brain and terrible memory.
 Hathi (voiced by Phil Lollar in seasons 1–2) – A wise Indian elephant who is the leader of the jungle's elephants.
 Gajjini – A light violet elephant who is the wife of Hathi.
 Appu and Hita/Heetah – Hathi and Gajjini's two calves who are Mowgli's friends.
 Rangoo – A colourful fruit-eating bird.
 Cheel – A kite.
 Ikki – An Indian crested porcupine.
 Rikki-Tikki-Tavi (voiced by Nigel Pilkington in seasons 1–2) – An Indian gray mongoose. Here he lives in the jungle with the other animals. Very cute-faced, ferret-sized and fearless (once even fought with Shere Khan in order to defend Mowgli).
 Thuu – An Indian cobra, occasionally the leader of a cobra's nest.
 Manny – A young langur monkey who is friends with Mowgli.
 Oo and Boo – A couple of old turtles.
 Pavo – A leucistic peacock.
 Alonna – A Demoiselle Crane.
 Hoola/Phoola – A peacock who is Pavo's rival.
 Rana – A purple Wild Pig who has a short temper.
 Ravi and Vira – A Bluebird couple.
 Chota – A young Tiger cub who is friends with Mowgli.
 Ponya – A red panda.
 Langur – A Himalayan monkey.
 ChuChip/ChooChip – A young Sambar Deer whom Mowgli befriends.
 Bella – A female bear that Baloo falls for, but she's actually trying to get rid of Baloo, but she later reformed after she and Baloo Recouncil.
 Lori and Barashinga is a deer with the same name who dreams of becoming one of Santa's flying Reindeer, Lori is a Loris who is always worried about Bara.
 Ackney is an Indian Giant Squirrel.

Production 
Tapaas Chakravarti, Chairman & CEO of DQ Entertainment, says: "The second season of Jungle Book was a simple decision after the tremendous success of the first season and the inherent demand by the global broadcasting community. Jungle Book already has a tremendous fan following and has created the need to see more and more of Mowgli and his jungle friends by the kids. We are confident that the second season will also be a tremendous commercial success. It will be followed by a TV Movie special, a Christmas special, a Halloween special and many other spin-offs. The partnership with ZDF is symbiotic in the sense that we are producing several other projects with them."

In 2012, DQ Entertainment announced a 3D feature film based on the animated series which was released in 2013. The film is produced by Tapaas Chakravarti, and directed by Jun Falkenstein and Kevin Johnson.

In October 2015, a third season was announced, which would be co-produced by Ellipsanime to air in 2017.

Episodes

Series overview

Season 1

Season 2

Season 3

See also
 List of Indian animated television series

References

External links
 
  – the series
  – the movie
  The Jungle Book Streaming on ZEE5

2010 French television series debuts
2020 French television series endings
2010s French animated television series
2020s French animated television series
2010 German television series debuts
2020 German television series endings
2010 Indian television series debuts
2020 Indian television series endings
French computer-animated television series
French children's animated adventure television series
French children's animated fantasy television series
French television shows based on children's books
German children's animated adventure television series
German children's animated fantasy television series
Indian computer-animation
Indian children's animated adventure television series
Indian children's animated fantasy television series
Works based on The Jungle Book
BBC children's television shows
Australian Broadcasting Corporation original programming
Animated television series about bears
Animated television series about cats
Television series about snakes
Television series about wolves
Television series about tigers
Animated television series about orphans
Television shows set in India
Television shows set in the British Raj
English-language television shows